Lockhart is a town in Covington County, Alabama, United States. At the 2020 census, the population was 445.

Geography
Lockhart is bordered by the town of Florala to the east.

History
Lockhart came into being about 1904 when the Jackson Lumber Company mill was constructed there, the community being a company town. Many streets were named for Native American tribes. The mill was erected to handle the dense forests of yellow pine in what was known as the "Jackson Tract". The town was named for Standard Oil magnate and Pittsburgh, Pennsylvania financier, Charles Lockhart. In 1912, the mill employed around a thousand workers and ran 24/7. At that time Lockhart was the largest lumber mill in the United States. Flooring for the famous Waldorf-Astoria Hotel in New York City came from Lockhart.

In 1903 the mill was the center of a peonage scandal. More than a hundred immigrant laborers recruited in cities in the North were held against their will in a walled compound on the site. Company officials were sentenced to as much as eighteen months in jail when convicted but were able to have their sentences reduced by political friends.

The milling facility was served by both the Central of Georgia Railroad and the Louisville and Nashville Railroad, connecting through nearby Florala, Alabama. "The mill, however, closed in 1940, and historical accounts offer two reasons. Military enlistments prior to U.S. entry in World War II caused a labor shortage, or company officials sold their holdings and the land to the residents after cutting all the timber in the area and deciding not to wait for replanted timber to mature. Jackson Lumber Company also donated much land to the state that was replanted and developed by the Civilian Conservation Corps into Geneva State Forest in neighboring Geneva County." This land had little value after it had been clear cut, the practice of the time, and being unable to sell the now-deforested acreage during the Great Depression, the company returned it to the state in the 1930s rather than pay taxes on it.

Demographics

As of the census of 2000, there were 548 people, 229 households, and 147 families residing in the town. The racial makeup of the town was 74.82% White, 23.91% Black or African American, 0.36% Native American, 0.36% Pacific Islander, and 0.55% from two or more races. 2.19% of the population were Hispanic or Latino of any race.

There were 229 households, out of which 30.6% had children under the age of 18 living with them, 48.5% were married couples living together, 11.8% had a female householder with no husband present, and 35.4% were non-families. 33.2% of all households were made up of individuals, and 15.7% had someone living alone who was 65 years of age or older. The average household size was 2.39 and the average family size was 3.01.

In the town, the population was 25.4% under the age of 18, 8.0% from 18 to 24, 24.8% from 25 to 44, 25.4% from 45 to 64, and 16.4% who were 65 years of age or older. The median age was 39 years. For every 100 females, there were 92.3 males. For every 100 females age 18 and over, there were 85.1 males. The median income for a household in the town was $23,281, and the median income for a family was $29,688. Males had a median income of $20,625 versus $18,750 for females. The per capita income for the town was $14,338. About 17.5% of families and 25.5% of the population were below the poverty line, including 32.4% of those under age 18 and 22.5% of those age 65 or over.

Education
WS Harlan Elementary School (1903)

Notable people
Charles LeMaistre. physician and educator
William March, author of The Bad Seed and World War I novel Company K. "March" was the maiden name of William's mother, which the writer chose for his pen name rather than his given name William Campbell.
Art White, former offensive lineman in the National Football League for the New York Giants and Chicago Cardinals

References 

Towns in Covington County, Alabama
Towns in Alabama
Populated places established in the 1900s
1900s establishments in Alabama